, also called Eiko or Peko, is a female J-pop singer-songwriter, and producer who is currently affiliated with Heart Company. She is best known for singing the opening themes of the anime series Higurashi When They Cry. Eiko also handles a school called Shimamiya Size (S-size) in Sapporo. Some of her former students are I've Sound singers Mami Kawada, Kotoko and Kaori Utatsuki. She announced on May 10, 2010, via Twitter that she was diagnosed with thyroid cancer. Her "Perfect World Live Tour", which was scheduled to begin in June, was subsequently canceled. She made an announcement of her full recovery from cancer on January 28, 2011.

Discography

Albums

Solo albums

Compilation albums

Extended plays (EPs)

Compilation albums

List of albums with at least one Eiko Shimamiya song. It may or may not be produced by her.

Singles

Indie Singles

Other appearances

Other songs

Solo works

I've Sound works

As producer

Extended plays (EPs)

References

External links
Official YouTube channel
 
Heart Company profile 

Living people
I've Sound members
Japanese women pop singers
Musicians from Hokkaido
People from Chitose, Hokkaido
Anime musicians
1965 births